Party is a 1994 short film starring Gary Coleman, Floyd Harden, DeAnna Hawkins, Ron Litman and Greg Nassief. The film was directed by Eric Swelstad and produced by Johnnie J. Young of J&E Studio Productions, from a script by Jay Woelfel based on a story by Nathaniel Hawthorne.

The film was shot in 1994 on location in Lucerne Valley in the Mojave Desert in California.

Plot
A hangman, a prostitute, a thief and a drunk try to make some sense out of the revelation that they are the last four people on earth. When a mysterious figure appears out of the desert claiming to be God, it sets off a chain of events which finally does answer their questions, but not necessarily in the way they had hoped.

Trivia
The filmmakers built a full-size functioning gallows in the middle of the Mojave Desert for the film's production.

External links
 

1994 comedy films
1994 films
1994 short films
American independent films
American comedy short films
1995 comedy films
1995 films
1990s English-language films
1990s American films